The Kanhaiya Nagar metro station is located on the Red Line of the Delhi Metro. This Metro Station serves thousand of daily commuters. The main beneficiary are those living in Tri Nagar and Ashok Vihar.

Station layout

Entry/Exit

Facilities
List of available ATM at Kanhiya Nagar metro station are 

 Punjab National Bank
 Oriental Bank of Commerce

Kanahiya Nagar Metro station also has a parking facility.

See also
List of Delhi Metro stations
Transport in Delhi
Delhi Metro Rail Corporation
Delhi Suburban Railway
List of rapid transit systems in India
Delhi Transport Corporation
List of Metro Systems

References

External links

 Delhi Metro Rail Corporation Ltd. (Official site)
 Delhi Metro Annual Reports
 
 UrbanRail.Net – descriptions of all metro systems in the world, each with a schematic map showing all stations.

Delhi Metro stations
Railway stations opened in 2004
Railway stations in North West Delhi district